is a fixed shooter arcade video game released in December 1980 by Taito. It was then released in Europe, and then in the Americas by Centuri and Amstar Electronics in January 1981.

The Phoenix mothership is one of the first video arcade game bosses to be presented as a separate challenge. It was a critical and commercial success, becoming one of Centuri's most successful titles.

Gameplay 

The player controls a spaceship that moves horizontally at the bottom of the screen, firing upward. Enemies, typically one of two types of birds, appear on the screen above the player's ship, shooting at it and periodically diving towards it in an attempt to crash into it. The ship is equipped with a shield that can be used to zap any of the alien creatures that attempt to crash into it. The player cannot move while the shield is active and must wait approximately five seconds before using it again.

The player starts with three or six lives, depending on the settings. One life is lost whenever the ship is hit by any enemy or projectile while the shield is down.

Each level has five separate rounds. The player must complete a round to advance to the next.
 Rounds 1 and 2 – The player must destroy a formation of alien birds. While in formation, some of the birds fly down kamikaze style, in an attempt to destroy the player's spaceship by crashing into it. Hitting a birdlike enemy flying diagonally awards a bonus score. The birdlike enemies are yellow in round 1, and pink in round 2. The player's spaceship is given rapid fire for round 2, where the birdlike creatures fly somewhat more unpredictably.
 Rounds 3 and 4 – Flying eggs float on the screen and seconds later hatch, revealing larger alien birds, resembling phoenixes, which swoop down at the player's spaceship. The only way to fully destroy one of these birdlike creatures is by hitting it in its belly; shooting one of its wings merely destroys that wing, and if both wings are destroyed, they will regenerate. From time to time the birdlike creatures may also revert to the egg form for a brief period. The birdlike creatures are blue in round 3, and pink in round 4.

 Round 5 – The player is pitted against the mothership, which is controlled by an alien creature sitting in its center. To complete this round, the player must create a hole in the conveyor belt-type shield to get a clear shot at the alien. Hitting the alien with a single shot ends the level and scores 400–8,200 points. The mothership fires missiles at the player's ship, moves slowly down towards it, and has alien birds (from rounds 1 and 2) protecting it. Defeating all of the birds will produce a new wave.

The game continues with increasing speed and unpredictability of the birdlike creature and phoenix flights.

Development and release
Phoenix was produced by "a smaller Japanese developer" according to Centuri's Joel Hochberg (who later worked for Rare). In Japan, a company called TPN licensed the game to Taito. Another company based in Japan, Hiraoka, licensed the game to Amstar Electronics, based in Phoenix, Arizona. Taito released the game for Japan in December 1980, and then it was released in Europe. Centuri acquired the American arcade license to the game from both Hiraoka and Amstar Electronics, and then Centuri released it for the Americas in January 1981. In North America, Centuri manufactured the upright arcade cabinet while Amstar Electronics manufactured the cocktail arcade cabinet.

Atari later released a port of Phoenix for the Atari 2600 in 1982.

Hardware 

Phoenix was available in both arcade and cocktail cabinets. A DIP switch setting allows the game to be moved between formats.

Most Phoenix games are in a standard Centuri woodgrain cabinet, but several other cabinets exist, due to this game being sold by multiple companies at the same time. These use sticker sideart (which covers the upper half of the machine), and glass marquees. The control panel is made up entirely of buttons; no joystick is present in the Centuri version, except for the international models and some cocktail versions. The monitor in this machine is mounted vertically, and the monitor bezel is relatively unadorned. Phoenix uses a unique wiring harness, which isn't known to be compatible with any other games.

Circuitry in the Centuri version:
 CPU: 8085 at 5.5 MHz.
 RAM: 4 kB (8 2114 1k x 4 chips.)
 ROM: 16 kB (8 2716 2k x 8 chips.)
 Audio: Matsushita MN6221AA chip, along with discrete circuitry.
 Video: discrete circuitry, utilizing 4 more 2716 2k x 8 EPROMs, as well as 2 256 x 4 bipolar PROMs.

Music
There are two pieces of music featured in the game:
 Romance de Amor also known as Spanish Romance by an unknown composer.
 Für Elise by Beethoven.
Both songs are built directly into the Matsushita MN6221AA Melody IC, as opposed to being programmed into the game's code as is standard in games. 
In some bootleg versions of the game, which used the namco galaxian Board, House of the rising sun is played at the start of the game.

Bugs
When the player shoots three birdlike enemies in a row very quickly as they fly upwards, the total score is set to a value in the vicinity of 204,000 points.

Reception
The arcade game was a commercial success in Japan and Europe, prior to its release in the Americas. It also went on to be a commercial success in North America, where it was one of Centuri's biggest hits.

Bill Kunkel and Arnie Katz of Electronic Games called Phoenix "perhaps the finest invasion title ever produced for the 2600!" with praise for its "fantastic graphics, unexcelled play-action and more". Computer and Video Games ranked it number one on its list of top ten Atari VCS games in 1983. The game received a Certificate of Merit in the category of "1984 Best Science Fiction/ Fantasy Videogame" at the 5th annual Arkie Awards. In 1995, Flux magazine ranked Phoenix 69th on their Top 100 Video Games.

In a retrospective review by Brett Alan Weiss (AllGame) the game was awarded a five out of five rating, referring to it as a "one of the most impressive games the "slide-and-shoot" genre has to offer, bested only by Galaga in terms of sheer enjoyment and replayability" and concluded that "Finely balanced shooting action combined with colorfully animated graphics make Phoenix a true classic among shooters."

Legacy

Re-releases
In 2005, Phoenix was released on the Xbox, PlayStation 2, PSP and Microsoft Windows as part of Taito Legends in the US and Europe, and Taito Memories II Gekan in Japan.

Clones 
 Griffon by Videotron in 1980
 Falcon by BGV in 1980
 Vautour by Jeutel in 1980 in France
 Condor by Sidam in 1981
 Demon Seed by Trend Software for the TRS-80 in 1982
 Pheenix by Megadodo for the ZX Spectrum in 1983
 Eagle Empire Alligata for the BBC Micro and the Commodore 64 in 1983
 Firebirds by Softek for the ZX Spectrum in 1983
Omega Phoenix for the Sinclair ZX81 in 2021

The Imagic game Demon Attack for the Atari 2600 closely resembled Phoenix which Atari owned the 2600 rights to. Atari sued Imagic, who settled out of court.

Bootlegs 
 Phoenix by T.P.N in 1980
 Phoenix by IRECSA, G.G.I Corp in 1980

See also

 Golden age of video arcade games
 Round-Up (video game)

References

External links 

 
 Phoenix at Arcade History
 Phoenix entry at the Centuri.net Arcade Database
 Phoenix for the Atari 2600 at Atari Mania

1980 video games
Arcade video games
Atari 2600 games
Fixed shooters
Phoenixes in popular culture
Video games about birds
Atari games
Taito arcade games
Video games set in outer space
Video games developed in Japan